The Italian Trade Agency (also ITA,) is a government agency of the Italian Republic whose purpose is to promote foreign trade and Italy's exports. It was established in 1926 with the Decreto reale n. 800 with the name of INE (Istituto nazionale per le esportazioni, "National Institute for Exports") and had the main task of "promoting the development of exports of products coming from the Italian soil and industry".
In 1935, the institute also developed specific skills in the field of imports by changing its name to Istituto nazionale per gli scambi con l'estero ("National Institute for Foreign Trade"). Subsequently, in 1945 it took the name ICE - Istituto nazionale per il commercio estero.

In July 2011, the ICE was abolished and shortly after in December 2011 it was reconstituted in the form of government agency with the name "ICE - Agency for the promotion abroad and internationalization of Italian companies" (ICE - Agenzia per la promozione all'estero e l'internazionalizzazione delle imprese italiane). After about 12 months of transitional management, from 1 January 2013 the new ICE Agency has been operational to support Italian exports and investments around the world and to encourage foreign investments in Italy. Outside Italy, it's best known as the Italian Trade Agency (ITA).

The current structure of ITA 
Starting from 1 January 2015, ITA owns about 64 offices worldwide, in close collaboration with the diplomatic-consular network and with the Italian chambers of commerce located abroad. Current president and general manager are Carlo Ferro and Roberto Luongo respectively. Former president and general manager0 were Michele Scannavini and Piergiorgio Borgogelli.; while they are currently Carlo Ferro and Roberto Luongo.

CorCE 
ITA is also known for its course focused on foreign trade and called CorCE (Corso di specializzazione in Commercio Estero, "Specialization Course in Foreign Trade"). CorCE first started in October 1962, with the first forty scholarships awarded by public tender and today it is a master's program for the internationalization of companies.

References

See also 
 Italian Republic
 Economy of Italy
 Italy

International trade
Government agencies of Italy
Compasso d'Oro Award recipients